Moscow City Duma District 34 is one of 45 constituencies in Moscow City Duma. The constituency has covered parts of South-Western Moscow since 2014. From 1993-2005 District 35 was based in North-Western Moscow; however, after the number of constituencies was reduced to 15 in 2005, the constituency was eliminated.

Members elected

Election results

2001

|-
! colspan=2 style="background-color:#E9E9E9;text-align:left;vertical-align:top;" |Candidate
! style="background-color:#E9E9E9;text-align:left;vertical-align:top;" |Party
! style="background-color:#E9E9E9;text-align:right;" |Votes
! style="background-color:#E9E9E9;text-align:right;" |%
|-
|style="background-color:"|
|align=left|Valery Skobinov
|align=left|Independent
|
|32.88%
|-
|style="background-color:"|
|align=left|Aleksandr Volodin
|align=left|Independent
|
|13.75%
|-
|style="background-color:"|
|align=left|Galina Leskova
|align=left|Independent
|
|11.38%
|-
|style="background-color:"|
|align=left|Vladimir Pomazanov
|align=left|Communist Party
|
|9.82%
|-
|style="background-color:"|
|align=left|Oleg Oreshkin
|align=left|Independent
|
|9.04%
|-
|style="background-color:#1042A5"|
|align=left|Yevgeny Proshechkin
|align=left|Union of Right Forces
|
|5.71%
|-
|style="background-color:"|
|align=left|Rim Shakirov
|align=left|Independent
|
|2.39%
|-
|style="background-color:#000000"|
|colspan=2 |against all
|
|11.54%
|-
| colspan="5" style="background-color:#E9E9E9;"|
|- style="font-weight:bold"
| colspan="3" style="text-align:left;" | Total
| 
| 100%
|-
| colspan="5" style="background-color:#E9E9E9;"|
|- style="font-weight:bold"
| colspan="4" |Source:
|
|}

2014

|-
! colspan=2 style="background-color:#E9E9E9;text-align:left;vertical-align:top;" |Candidate
! style="background-color:#E9E9E9;text-align:left;vertical-align:top;" |Party
! style="background-color:#E9E9E9;text-align:right;" |Votes
! style="background-color:#E9E9E9;text-align:right;" |%
|-
|style="background-color:"|
|align=left|Aleksandr Semennikov
|align=left|United Russia
|
|42.04%
|-
|style="background-color:"|
|align=left|Vladimir Kochetkov
|align=left|A Just Russia
|
|21.25%
|-
|style="background-color:"|
|align=left|Gennady Zhivotov
|align=left|Communist Party
|
|16.39%
|-
|style="background-color:"|
|align=left|Georgy Ogorodnikov
|align=left|Yabloko
|
|10.15%
|-
|style="background-color:"|
|align=left|Anton Yurikov
|align=left|Liberal Democratic Party
|
|6.67%
|-
| colspan="5" style="background-color:#E9E9E9;"|
|- style="font-weight:bold"
| colspan="3" style="text-align:left;" | Total
| 
| 100%
|-
| colspan="5" style="background-color:#E9E9E9;"|
|- style="font-weight:bold"
| colspan="4" |Source:
|
|}

2019

|-
! colspan=2 style="background-color:#E9E9E9;text-align:left;vertical-align:top;" |Candidate
! style="background-color:#E9E9E9;text-align:left;vertical-align:top;" |Party
! style="background-color:#E9E9E9;text-align:right;" |Votes
! style="background-color:#E9E9E9;text-align:right;" |%
|-
|style="background-color:"|
|align=left|Aleksandr Semennikov (incumbent)
|align=left|Independent
|
|36.43%
|-
|style="background-color:"|
|align=left|Yulia Gladkova
|align=left|Communist Party
|
|34.67%
|-
|style="background-color:"|
|align=left|Maksim Chirkov
|align=left|A Just Russia
|
|12.74%
|-
|style="background-color:"|
|align=left|Anton Yurikov
|align=left|Liberal Democratic Party
|
|6.45%
|-
|style="background-color:"|
|align=left|Aleksandr Filatov
|align=left|Communists of Russia
|
|6.35%
|-
| colspan="5" style="background-color:#E9E9E9;"|
|- style="font-weight:bold"
| colspan="3" style="text-align:left;" | Total
| 
| 100%
|-
| colspan="5" style="background-color:#E9E9E9;"|
|- style="font-weight:bold"
| colspan="4" |Source:
|
|}

References

Moscow City Duma districts